Abdullah ibn Muhammad Al ash-Sheikh (born 1948) is the chairman of the Majlis ash-Shura (Consultative Assembly) of Saudi Arabia since February 2009. He was the minister of Justice from February 1992 to February 2009.

Background and education
Abdullah ibn Muhammad Al ash-Sheikh is a member of a noted family of Saudi religious scholars, the Al ash-Sheikh. He was born in Diriyah in 1948 and was educated by his father, Muhammad ibn Ibrahim Al ash-Sheikh former Grand Mufti of Saudi Arabia. He also studied the interpretation of the Quran and jurisprudence principles with the late Sheikh Abdulrazaq Afifi. He attended the Shariah College in Riyadh (later renamed Imam Muhammad Bin Saud Islamic University) and graduated with a bachelor's degree in Sharia in 1975. He then studied Sharia at Al-Azhar University in Cairo and returned to Saudi Arabia to obtain a doctorate degree in 1987. He earned his PhD degree in Fiqh from Imam Mohammed bin Saudi University in 1987.

Career
After obtaining his doctorate, Al ash-Sheikh became a lecturer and professor in the Sharia College of Imam Muhammed bin Saud Islamic University until his appointment as minister of justice. in November 1992. He replaced Muhammad Al Jubair as minister. On the instructions of the King, he drew up the judiary law of 2007. These reforms envisaged the creation of specialized courts to operate in parallel with the traditional sharia courts, particularly in areas of commercial litigation. In effect, the reform may allow certain cases to be judged without reference to Sharia. Another important aspect of the reform was the creation of a Supreme Court. The laws covering the judicial reforms were passed in October 2007, but implementation was slow.

Al ash-Sheikh announced in July 2008 that he had submitted a plan of action for the judiciary reforms to the King, but little was heard further until it was announced in 2009 that he would cease to be minister of justice in a major cabinet reshuffle. He was replaced by Muhammad bin Abdul Karim Issa as justice minister on 14 February 2009. It was reported that King Abdullah's objective in the reshuffle was to replace conservative incumbents with younger, more progressive candidates. It was also stated that he was one of the conservatives in the cabinet replaced.

Later, he was appointed chairman of the Majlis ash Shura in 2009.

Other appointments
He is a member of Council of Senior Ulema and the Supreme Council for Islamic Affairs.

References

20th-century Saudi Arabian politicians
21st-century Saudi Arabian politicians
1948 births
Al-Azhar University alumni
Government ministers of Saudi Arabia
Imam Muhammad ibn Saud Islamic University alumni
Academic staff of Imam Muhammad ibn Saud Islamic University
Justice ministers of Saudi Arabia
Living people
Members of the Consultative Assembly of Saudi Arabia
Speakers of the Consultative Assembly of Saudi Arabia
Saudi Arabian expatriates in Egypt